Lucie Horsch (born 1999) is a Dutch recorder player.

She started playing the recorder at the age of five, and received her first national recognition at the age of nine, when her performance at Kinderprinsengrachtconcert was broadcast on national television. She studied recorder with Walter van Hauwe and piano with Marjes Benoist and Jan Wijn at Conservatorium van Amsterdam.

In 2014 she represented the Netherlands in the Eurovision Young Musicians contest, and in 2016 she received the "Young Talent" award from Concertgebouw. She started an international solo career and she has been praised as one of the most talented recorder players of her generation. In 2017 her first recording was published, a collection of Vivaldi recorder concertos that won her the Edison Award. In 2019 her second recording, a collection of baroque concertos with the Academy of Ancient Music, was awarded the Opus Klassik prize. In 2020 she received the Nederlandse Muziekprijs from the Dutch Ministry of Education, Culture and Science.

References

External links

 Official website

1999 births
Dutch recorder players
Living people
Eurovision Young Musicians Finalists
21st-century Dutch musicians
21st-century women musicians
Conservatorium van Amsterdam alumni